Private Lives is a 1930 play by Noël Coward.

Private Lives may also refer to:

Private Lives (film), based on the play by Noël Coward 
"Private Lives" (House), an episode of the television series House
Private Lives (band), a former British musical group
Private Lives (TV series), a South Korean television series

See also
Private Life (disambiguation)